Jarlath Burns (born 1968) is an Irish former Gaelic footballer and president elect of the GAA. His league and championship career at senior level with the Armagh county team spanned thirteen seasons from 1987 until 1999.

Burns made his debut with the Armagh senior team in 1987. Over the course of the following thirteen seasons he had little success; however, the highlight of his career was captaining Armagh to an Ulster title in 1999. Burns also won two McKenna Cup titles.

Burns managed the Ireland women's international rules football team that defeated Australia in the 2006 Ladies' International Rules Series.

In retirement from playing, Burns has become involved in the administrative affairs of the Gaelic Athletic Association. With his local club he has served as an underage manager, club chairman and secretary. At county level, Burns was Armagh's Central Council delegate from 2010 to 2015. His involvement with the GAA at national level began in 2000 when he was appointed as the first players’ representative to Central Council. Since then he has been involved in Scór, the GAA's medical and welfare committee, the GAA 125 anniversary committee, the pitch presentations committee and he has served as chairman of the standing committee on playing rules.

In 2013, he became the principal of St Paul's High School, Bessbrook. Burns has worked in the media as a Gaelic football analyst on The Championship on the BBC, as well as on The Sunday Game on RTÉ and GAA Beo on TG4.

In February 2023, he was elected as President-elect of the GAA. He will begin his term in 2024.

References

External links
 RTÉ: Armagh set to propose Jarlath Burns as next GAA President

1968 births
Living people
Armagh County Board administrators
Armagh inter-county Gaelic footballers
Gaelic games administrators
Gaelic games club administrators
Gaelic games writers and broadcasters
Heads of schools in Northern Ireland
People from Bessbrook
Schoolteachers from Northern Ireland
Silverbridge Harps Gaelic footballers